Oleg Alexandrovich Kudryashov (24.01.1932 – 13.09.2022) is one of the most important Russian painters and printmakers of the Post-War era. He is currently living and working in Moscow.  He almost exclusively works on paper using drypoint and watercolor/gouache as his medium. He is best known for his three-dimensional works, called constructions or reliefs, made by cutting and folding printed works to create sculptural pieces.  Most of his works are unique or in very small editions.

Early life
Born in Moscow, Kudryashov initially studied in an art studio for youths from 1942 to 1947 and at the Grabar Art School for Children from 1949 to 1951.  After serving in the Russian military, he spent the next three years [1956 to 1958] at the Moscow Animation Film Studios.  In 1961 Kudryashov joined the Moscow Organization of Artists Union.  He was well known in avant-garde circles but rarely exhibited together with his fellow artists.  In 1974 he emigrated to London, England.  Before departing he burned his life’s work of some twenty years in an open airfield on the outskirts of the Russian capital.   After spending almost 25 years in London, he returned to Moscow in 1997.

Career
Kudryashov’s work is difficult to categorize since it is at once both representational and abstract.  He does not want to be pigeonholed and believes that ideology is the enemy of art because it limits the human imagination.   Although his work is influenced by Russian constructivism and Suprematism, Lubok prints, and Russian Orthodox icons, Kudryashov does not share their utopian ideals.   
Kudryashov creates sculpture, videos, performance pieces, book illustrations, and an occasional collage but, is primarily a printmaker.  His favorite technique is drypoint and engraving and his preferred material is the industrial zinc plate.  Kudryashov does no preparatory studies prior to drawing directly on the plate using a large burin or engraving needle. For his larger prints he lays the sheet of zinc directly on the floor and works from all sides.  For colored prints, paint is applied to the paper before being run through the press with the inked zinc plate.

Later Three-Dimensional Works

In 1978 Kudryashov systematically began to produce three dimensional reliefs from his drypoint prints.  For these pieces, the image is run twice through the press and one of the images is cut into various geometrical shapes.  Then, the cut-up geometrical shapes are slotted one into another and the resultant three-dimensional construct is attached to the initial print.   These art works blur the boundary between printing, painting, and sculpture.  While Kudryashov “draws on the zinc plate as if it where a piece of paper, he uses the printed paper as if it were metal, exploiting its stiffness to cut and bend it into rigid structures.”

Since 1978 Kudryashov has been exhibited and collected widely in Europe, the United States, Japan and Russia. He is currently represented by Robert Brown Gallery in Washington, DC. In recent years, Kudryashov has exhibited alongside artists such as William Kentridge at the Kreeger Museum's 'Against the Grain,' as well as David Nash and Richard Serra at Robert Brown Gallery's 'Flattening the Form'.

Monograph

The first monograph 'Oleg Kudryashov. Bridge to the Future' was written by Christina Lodder, Edward Lucie-Smith, Igor Golomstock and Sergei Reviakin and published in the United Kingdom in 2017.

Exhibitions
During his extensive career, Kudryashov has participated in many exhibitions, both solo and group, worldwide. Here is a list of selected solo exhibitions covering five decades.

List of Solo Exhibitions

2018 Oleg Kudryashov: Bridge to the Future, Russian Cultural Centre, London, United Kingdom

2016 New Acquisitions of Prints and Drawings in 2009–2014, Pushkin State Museum of Fine Arts, Moscow, Russia

2015 Oleg Kudryashov: Retrospective, Woland Associazione Culturale, Magazzino delle Idee, Municipal Art Gallery, Trieste, Italy

2012 Freedom Inside Yourself: Retrospective, Bermondsey Project, London, England

2004 Masters Gallery, Moscow, Russia

2001 LeVall Gallery, Novosibirsk, Russia (retrospective)

1999 Tretyakov Gallery, Moscow (retrospective); Brjansk Museum, Brjansk, Russia

1998 Francis Graham-Dixon Gallery (at the Grosvenor Gallery), London

1997-98 Oleg Kudryashov: Constructions, Drypoints and Paper Sculptures, Duke University, North Carolina

1997 Robert Brown Gallery, Washington, DC

1996 Pictures and Prints 1995-96, 107 Workshop Gallery, Wiltshire, England

1995 Oleg Kudryashov, Moscow Remembered, The George Washington University Dimock Gallery, Washington DC

1994 Robert Brown Gallery, Washington, DC

1993 Francis Graham-Dixon Gallery, London

1992-93 The Central House of Artists, Moscow

1992 Prints and Reliefs, Pushkin State Museum of Fine Arts, Moscow; Galerie Saint-Guillaume, Tokyo, Japan

1991 Patrick Cramer Gallery, Geneva, Switzerland; Francis Graham-Dixon Gallery, London; Robert Brown Gallery, Washington DC

1990 The Central House of Artists, Moscow (retrospective)

1989 Art-Connection, Basel, Switzerland; Roger Ramsay Gallery, Chicago

1988 Douglas Hyde Gallery, Trinity College Dublin, Ireland; Patrick Cramer Gallery, Geneva; Robert Brown Gallery, Washington DC

1987 Marlene Eleini Gallery, London; St Paul's Gallery, Leeds, England

1986 Patrick Cramer Gallery, Geneva, Switzerland; Albert Totah Gallery, New York; Robert Brown Gallery, Washington DC

1984 Robert Brown Gallery, Washington DC; Coracle Press Gallery, London

1983 Riverside Studios, London

1982 Robert Brown Gallery, Washington DC

1976 Acme Gallery, London

Selected Public Collections
Arts Council of England
Baltimore Museum of Art, Baltimore, Maryland
Museum Boijmans Van Beuningen, Rotterdam, Netherlands
Collection of the City New-Ulm
Contemporary Art Society, London, England
Fitzwilliam Museum, Cambridge, England
Grafische Sammlung, Schaetzlerpalais, Augsburg, Germany
Hirshhorn Museum and Sculpture Garden, Smithsonian Institution, Washington, DC
Hunterian Museum and Art Gallery, Glasgow, Scotland
Kreeger Museum, Washington, DC
Los Angeles County Museum of Art
Minneapolis Institute of Art
Museum of Fine Arts, Boston, Massachusetts
National Gallery Prague, Prague, Czech Republic 
National Gallery of Art, Washington, DC
Norwich Castle Museum
The Phillips Collection, Washington, DC
Pushkin Museum of Fine Arts, Moscow, Russia
State Library of Saltykov-Schedrin, St. Petersburg, Russia
State Museum of Literature, Moscow
Tate Gallery, London
Tretyakov Gallery, Moscow
Trinity College Dublin, Ireland
Victoria and Albert Museum, London
Wakefield Art Gallery
Yale Center for British Art, New Haven

References

External links
 Official website
 At Kreeger Museum
 At Robert Brown Gallery

1932 births
Russian printmakers
Artists from Moscow
Russian avant-garde
Living people